Mero may refer to:

Places
Mero, Dominica, a small village on the west coast of Dominica
Mero River, a river in Dominica
Mero Mound Group (Diamond Bluff Site), an archeological site near Diamond Bluff, Wisconsin, in Pierce County, Wisconsin

People
Mero (rapper) (born 2000), birth name Enes Meral, German rapper of Turkish descent

Surname
Bruhs Mero (1911–1995) who with Gean Harwood (1909-2006) recounted their story in the book The Oldest Gay Couple in America: A Seventy-Year Journey Through Same-Sex America
Dave Meros (born 1956), American bass guitar player
Joel Mero (born 1995), Finnish footballer 
Joseph Mero (born c. 1965), American pair skater
László Mérő (born 1949), Jewish Hungarian research psychologist and popular science author
Marc Mero (born 1960), American amateur boxer and professional wrestler, motivational speaker
Muhammad Mustafa Mero (born 1941), Syrian politician, former Prime Minister of Syria (2000–2003)
The Kid Mero, or Joel Martinez (born 1983), Dominican-American writer, comedian, TV personality, voice actor and part of duo host Desus & Mero
Rena Mero (born 1967), better known as Sable, American model, actress, and retired professional wrestler
Vittorio Mero (1974–2002), Italian footballer
Yolanda Mero or Jolanda Mero (1887–1963), Hungarian-American pianist, opera and theatre impresario, and philanthropist

Business and economy
Barry M, or Barry Mero, a British cruelty-free cosmetics company, specialising in on trend make-up and nail products
MERO ČR, operator of the Czech part of the Druzhba pipeline
Mero Air, an airline based in Nepal
Mero Mobile, now known as Ncell, mobile service provider from Nepal
Mero-Schmidlin, an English business specializing in building construction systems

Science
Patagonian toothfish (Dissostichus eleginoides}, a species of notothen found in cold ocean waters
Merus, a member of the grouper genus Epinephelus

Film and television
A Mero Hajur 2, a Nepali musical romantic movie directed by Jharana Thapa
A Mero Hajur 3 (English: Oh My Dear 3), a Nepali romantic comedy-drama film directed by Jharana Thapa
Desus & Mero (2016 TV series), an American television late-night talk show on Viceland hosted by Desus Nice and The Kid Mero
Desus & Mero (2019 TV series), an American television late-night talk show series on Showtime hosted by comedians Desus Nice and The Kid Mero
Kohi Mero, a 2010 Nepali film directed by Alok Nembang
Mero Euta Saathi Cha (English title: I Have One Special Friend), a 2009 Nepali movie, an unofficial remake of the Korean hit A Millionaire's First Love

Music
Mero (rapper) (born 2000), stage name of Enes Meral, Turkish-German rapper
"The Mero", a song by Pete St. John
"Star Mero Mero Heart", a song by Masayo Kurata
Los Mero Meros, a compilation album by various artists presented by Lennox

Others
Meroune "Mero" Lorelei, a character in the Japanese manga series Monster Musume
USS Mero (SS-378), a Balao-class submarine, was a ship of the United States Navy

See also
Meros (disambiguation)